The 2006 European Promotion Cup for Women was the ninth edition of the basketball European Promotion Cup for Women, today known as FIBA Women's European Championship for Small Countries. The tournament took place in Ta' Qali, Malta, from 18 to 23 July 2006. Luxembourg women's national basketball team won the tournament for the first time.

Participating teams

First round
In the first round, the teams were drawn into two groups. The first two teams from each group advance to the semifinals, the other teams will play in the 5th–7th place classification.

Group A

Group B

5th–7th place classification

Group C

Playoffs

Semifinals

3rd place match

Final

Final standings

References

FIBA Women's European Championship for Small Countries
Promotion Cup
International sports competitions hosted by Malta
Basketball in Malta
2006 in Maltese sport
European Promotion Cup for Women